The Enghelab Sport Complex, previously known as the Imperial Country Club is a sport complex in Tehran, Iran. The complex was opened in 1958 under the rule of Mohammad Reza Pahlavi, the last Shah of Iran. The complex hosts about 10 000 people daily who participate in different activities.

Facilities
 Enghelab Golf Course
 Enghelab Skating Academy
 Matrix Paintball Club
 Enghelab Bowling Club
 Enghelab Tennis Courts
 Enghelab Squash Club
 Enghelab Skating & Inline Hockey Arena
 Enghelab Indoors & Outdoors Swimming Pools
 Enghelab Fishing Pool
 Enghelab Karting Track
 Enghelab Basketball Halls
 Enghelab Soccer Fields
 Enghelab Fitness Gym

References

External links 
 
  Enghelab Sport Complex

Sports venues completed in 1958
Sports venues in Tehran
1958 establishments in Iran
Cross country running venues